Sueca may refer to:
 Sueca (card game), a Portuguese trick-taking card game
 Sueca, Valencia, a city in eastern Spain
 "Sueca", the Portuguese, Spanish and Galician, Catalan and Valencian word for Swedish woman
 Sueca Ricers, an American football team in Sueca, Spain
 Sueca italiana